Verkh-Ya is a rural locality (a selo) in Aysky Selsoviet, Altaysky District, Altai Krai, Russia. The population was 306 as of 2013. There are 3 streets.

Geography 
Verkh-Ya is located on the Aya River, 31 km east of Altayskoye (the district's administrative centre) by road. Aya is the nearest rural locality.

References 

Rural localities in Altaysky District, Altai Krai